Təzəkənd (also, Gusyulyu-Tazakend and Tazakend) is a village and municipality in the Aghjabadi Rayon of Azerbaijan.  It has a population of 2,100.

References 

Populated places in Aghjabadi District